A subordinate  judge (also called subjudge, sub judge, or sub-judge) is the judge of the subordinate court in the system of District Courts of India.

References

External links
 District Court websites
 District Courts of India, Official website
Delhi District Courts, Official website
 Maharashtra District Courts, Official website

Judiciary of India